Antonio Giménez (born 25 June 1931) is an Argentine cyclist. He competed in the men's sprint event at the 1952 Summer Olympics.

References

External links
 

1931 births
Possibly living people
Argentine male cyclists
Olympic cyclists of Argentina
Cyclists at the 1952 Summer Olympics
20th-century Argentine people